Brutti Mansion is a mansion in Koper, a port town in southwestern Slovenia. It was built in the late-Baroque style in 1714 according to plans by the architect Giorgio Massari, at the request of Count Barnabi Brutti.

It houses the central library of Koper, named after the librarian and politician .

Palaces and mansions in Koper
Baroque palaces
Residential buildings completed in 1714
1714 establishments in the Republic of Venice